Joseph Harrison Cain (born June 11, 1965) is a former American football linebacker who played nine seasons in the National Football League.

Cain graduated in 1983 from Compton High School in Compton, California. He attended Stanford University on an academic scholarship, and joined the football team as a walk-on. He later transferred to Oregon Institute of Technology, after Greg McMackin, who was the assistant linebackers coach at Stanford, obtained the head coaching position.

Joe Cain is Executive Chef at a cafe on Orcas Island in Washington State. He is a father of three children and grandfather of one.

References

1965 births
Living people
Players of American football from Compton, California
American football linebackers
Stanford Cardinal football players
Oregon Tech Hustlin' Owls football players
Minnesota Vikings players
Seattle Seahawks players
Chicago Bears players